The miR-103 microRNA precursor (homologous to miR-107), is a short non-coding RNA gene involved in gene regulation.
miR-103 and miR-107 have now been predicted or experimentally confirmed in human.

microRNAs are transcribed as ~70 nucleotide precursors and subsequently processed by the Dicer enzyme to give a ~22 nucleotide product.  In this case the mature sequence comes from
the 5' arm of the precursor.  The mature products are thought to have regulatory roles through complementarity to mRNA.

mir-103 and mir-107 were noted as being upregulated in obese mice and were subsequently found to have a key role in insulin sensitivity. This led to a suggestion that these microRNAs represent potential targets for the treatment of type 2 diabetes.

mir-103 has also been linked with chronic pain and intestinal cell proliferation.

Recently, miR-103-3p was shown to target the 5' untranslated region (5' UTR) of GPRC5A's mRNA in pancreatic cancer. This is one of only a handful of known instances where a miRNA targets the 5' UTR of a mRNA.

References

External links 
 
 miRBase family MIPF0000024

MicroRNA